Els Munts is a mountain of Catalonia, Spain. It has an elevation of 1,057 metres above sea level.

References

Mountains of Catalonia